Rongshui may refer to the following locations in China:

Rongshui Miao Autonomous County (融水苗族自治县), Liuzhou, Guangxi
Rongshui Town (融水镇), town in and seat of Rongshui County
Rong River, tributary of the Pearl River in Guangxi